Philip Walter "Lefty" Weinert (April 21, 1902 – April 17, 1973), was a Major League Baseball pitcher who played from  to  with three teams. In 1929 he tied for 6th in wins and 4th in won-loss percentage (.692) in the Southern Association, as he was 18–8 with a 3.00 ERA for the Memphis Chickasaws.  He batted and threw left-handed.  Weinert was born in Philadelphia, Pennsylvania, and died in Rockledge, Florida, and was Jewish.

References

External links

1902 births
1973 deaths
Baseball players from Pennsylvania
Brooklyn Dodgers scouts
Chattanooga Lookouts players
Chicago Cubs players
Cleveland Indians scouts
Columbus Red Birds players
Indianapolis Indians players
Los Angeles Angels (minor league) players
Louisville Colonels (minor league) players
Major League Baseball pitchers
Memphis Chickasaws players
Minneapolis Millers (baseball) players
Mission Bells players
New York Yankees players
Philadelphia Phillies players
Reading Aces players
St. Paul Saints (AA) players
Villanova Wildcats baseball coaches
People from Rockledge, Florida
Jewish American baseball players
Jewish Major League Baseball players
20th-century American Jews